Rhiroy is a remote crofting township situated on the west shore of Loch Broom in Garve, Ross-shire, Scottish Highlands and is in the Scottish council area of Highland.

The hamlets of Blarnalearoch and Loggie lie directly northwest along the coast road.

References

Populated places in Ross and Cromarty